Kasbi is a town belonging to the Kasbi district of Qashqadaryo region in the Republic of Uzbekistan. The town's status was given in 2009.

References 

Populated places in Qashqadaryo Region